Chalcidomorphina is a genus of flies in the family Stratiomyidae.

Species
Chalcidomorphina argentea McFadden, 1980
Chalcidomorphina aurata Enderlein, 1914
Chalcidomorphina planes James, 1967
Chalcidomorphina terataspis James, 1974

References

Stratiomyidae
Brachycera genera
Taxa named by Günther Enderlein
Diptera of North America
Diptera of South America